Joaquin Andres Riera (San Miguel de Tucuman, 22 February 1994) is an Argentine rugby union player.
His usual position is as a Centre and he currently plays for Benetton Rugby in Pro14. 

For 2019–20 Pro14 season, he named like Permit Player for Benetton in Pro 14.

After playing for Argentina Under 20 in 2014, from 2015 to 2017 Riera was named in the Argentina Sevens for World Rugby Sevens Series.

References

External links 
It's Rugby France profile
Ultimate Rugby Profile

1994 births
Living people
Argentine rugby union players
L'Aquila Rugby players
Petrarca Rugby players
Benetton Rugby players
Rugby union centres
Sportspeople from San Miguel de Tucumán